ESFA may refer to

Education and Skills Funding Agency, an agency of the UK Department for Education
English Schools' Football Association